Heterodon simus, commonly known as the southern hog-nosed snake, is a harmless snake species endemic to the southeastern United States. No subspecies are currently recognized.

Description
Adults are 35.5–61 cm (14-24 inches) in total length. Stout with a wide neck and a sharply upturned snout, they usually have 25 rows of keeled dorsal scales at midbody.

The dorsal color pattern consists of a light brown, yellowish, grayish, or reddish ground color, overlaid with a distinct row of dark blotches that alternate with smaller blotches on the flanks. The belly is distinctly darker in color than the underside of the tail in juveniles.  As the snake ages, the underside usually becomes a pale white.

Habitat
The native habitats of Heterodon simus are xeric grasslands such as longleaf pine sandhill, upland pine forest, and scrubby flatwoods. In some areas, populations persist in mosaics of overgrown pastures, dry river floodplains, fields, and pine plantation.

Geographic range
The Southern hognose snake is found on the coastal plain of the southeastern United States from North Carolina, south to Lake Okeechobee in Florida, and west to Mississippi.

Diet
Heterodon simus preys upon toads, frogs (especially Hyla gratiosa and Pseudacris ornata), spadefoots, and mice.

Reproduction
This species is oviparous. mature adults mate from April through August. The thin-shelled, leathery, whitish eggs are laid in clutches of 6-14. After 55–60 days the eggs hatch. Each hatchling is 15–18 cm (6-7 inches) in total length.

Conservation status
This species is classified as Vulnerable (VU) on the IUCN Red List of Threatened Species with the following criteria: C1+2a(i) (v3.1, 2001). A species is listed as such when the best available evidence indicates that the population size is estimated to number fewer than 10,000 mature individuals, a decline of at least 10% is estimated to continue within 10 years or three generations, whichever is longer, (up to a maximum of 100 years in the future), and a continuing decline has been observed, projected, or inferred, in numbers of mature individuals and no subpopulation is estimated to contain more than 1,000 mature individuals. It is therefore considered to be facing a high risk of extinction in the wild. The population trend is down. Year assessed: 2007.  The Alabama Department of Conservation and Natural Resources has listed the species as possibly extirpated within the state.

References

Further reading
Conant, R. 1975. A Field Guide to Reptiles and Amphibians of Eastern and Central North America, Second Edition. Houghton Mifflin. Boston. xviii + 429 pp.  (hardcover),  (paperback). (Heterodon simus, p. 170 + Plate 25 + Map 132.)
Conant, R., and William Bridges. 1939. What Snake Is That? A Field Guide to the Snakes of the United States East of the Rocky Mountains. (With 108 drawings by Edmond Malnate.) D. Appleton-Century. New York and London. Frontispiece map + viii + 163 pp. + Plates A-C, 1-32. (Heterodon simus, p. 41 + Plate 5, Figure 13.)
Linnaeus, C. 1766. Systema naturæ per regna tria naturæ, secundum classes, ordines, genera, species, cum characteribus, differentiis, synonymis, locis. Tomus I. Editio Duodecima, Reformata. L. Salvius. Stockholm. 532 pp. (Coluber simus, p. 375.)
Schmidt, K.P., and D. Dwight Davis. 1941. Field Book of Snakes of the United States and Canada. G.P. Putnam's Sons. New York. 365 pp. (Heterodon simus, pp. 116–118, Figures 25-26.)

External links

 
 Project Simus Florida

Heterodon
Reptiles described in 1766
Taxa named by Carl Linnaeus
Reptiles of the United States
Fauna of the Southeastern United States